JShell is a Java read-eval-print loop which was first introduced in the JDK 9. It is tracked by JEP 222 jshell: The Java Shell (Read-Eval-Print Loop). One reason why JShell was proposed for Java 9 is the lack of a standard interactive environment for the language; the de facto library to use a Java REPL was often BeanShell, which has been dormant since 2003, and arbitrarily diverged from the Java language.

Example
jshell> int a[] = {0,1,3,5,8}
a ==> int[5] { 0, 1, 3, 5, 8 }

jshell> int fact(int n){
   ...>     return n<2?1:n*fact(n-1);
   ...> }
|  created method fact(int)

jshell> for (int i=0 ; i<a.length ; ++i)
   ...>     a[i] = fact(a[i]);

jshell> a
a ==> int[5] { 1, 1, 6, 120, 40320 }

See also
 Exploratory programming

References

Command shells
Cross-platform software
Virtual machine
Java platform software
Interpreters (computing)